Pau is the Catalan equivalent of the given name Paul and is also the word for "peace" in that language. Notable people with the name include:
 Pau Audouard (1857–1918), renowned photographer active in Barcelona
 Pablo Casals (1876-1973), known as Pau Casals in Catalan, Catalan cellist
 Pau Cendrós López (born 1987), Spanish football player
 Pau Claris i Casademunt (1586–1641), Catalan lawyer, clergyman and 94th President of Catalonia
 Pau de Bellviure (fourteenth and/or fifteenth centuries), Catalan poet
 Pau Faner Coll (born 1949), Spanish novelist and painter
 Pau Franch (born 1988), Spanish professional football player
 Pau Gasol (born 1980), Spanish basketball player
 Pau Ribas (born 1987), Spanish professional basketball player
 Pau Sabater (1884-1919), Spanish anarcho-syndicalist
 Pau Torres (footballer, born 1987), Spanish football goalkeeper
 Pau Torres (footballer, born 1997), Spanish football defender
 Pau Villalonga (died 1609), Spanish composer

See also
 Pau (disambiguation)
 Joan Pau 

Catalan masculine given names